The third season of Madam Secretary, an American political drama television series, originally aired on CBS from October 2, 2016, through May 21, 2017. The season was produced by CBS Television Studios, with Barbara Hall as showrunner and executive producer. Madam Secretary was renewed for a third season on March 25, 2016.

The series follows Elizabeth McCord (Téa Leoni), the United States Secretary of State who, alongside President Conrad Dalton (Keith Carradine) and a dedicated staff led by Nadine Tolliver (Bebe Neuwirth), is instrumental in the shaping of a U.S. foreign policy. McCord is married to Henry (Tim Daly), a religious scholar and NSA handler.

Cast and characters

Main
 Téa Leoni as Elizabeth McCord, the United States Secretary of State
 Tim Daly as Henry McCord, Elizabeth's husband and a National Security Agency operative
 Keith Carradine as Conrad Dalton, President of the United States
 Erich Bergen as Blake Moran, Elizabeth's personal assistant
 Patina Miller as Daisy Grant, Elizabeth's press coordinator
 Geoffrey Arend as Matt Mahoney, Elizabeth's speechwriter
 Sebastian Arcelus as Jay Whitman, Elizabeth's policy advisor
 Katherine Herzer as Alison McCord, Elizabeth and Henry's younger daughter
 Evan Roe as Jason McCord, Elizabeth and Henry's son
 Wallis Currie-Wood as Stephanie "Stevie" McCord, Elizabeth and Henry's older daughter
 Željko Ivanek as Russell Jackson, White House Chief of Staff
 Bebe Neuwirth as Nadine Tolliver, Elizabeth's chief of staff

Recurring
 Johanna Day as National Security Advisor Admiral (retired) Ellen Hill
 Tony Plana as Admiral Ed Parker, a member of the Joint Chiefs 
 Clifton Davis as Ephraim Ware, Director of National Intelligence
 Mandy Gonzalez as Lucy Knox, President Dalton's aide 
 J. C. MacKenzie as Governor Sam Evans of Pennsylvania, the presidential nominee for Dalton's party
 Francis Jue as Chinese Foreign Minister Chen
 Stephanie J. Block as Abby Whitman, Jay's wife.
 Justine Lupe as Ronnie Baker, a United States Army captain seconded from United States Cyber Command
 Chris Petrovski as Dmitri Petrov, a former Russian spy who joins the Central Intelligence Agency to work for Henry

Guests
 Morgan Freeman as Frawley, the Chief Justice of the United States
 Jane Pauley as herself 
 Carlos Gomez as Jose Campos
 Monna Sabouri as the Interpreter, a Russian and Persian speaking agent
 Justin Baldoni as Kevin Park
 Joel de la Fuente as Datu Andrada, the President of the Philippines
 Christine Garver as Molly Reid

Episodes

Production

Development
Madam Secretary was renewed for a third season on March 25, 2016.

Ratings

Home media
The DVD release of season three is set to be released in Region 1 on September 19, 2017.

References

2016 American television seasons
2017 American television seasons
Season 3